The Charolais-Brionnais region is located in the southwest of the French department of the Saône-et-Loire in Burgundy. Created in 2004, the region comprises a population of 90,000 inhabitants across 129 municipalities.

Geography 
The Charolais-Brionnais region is home to the renowned Charolais cattle and is an applicant for UNESCO status as a World Heritage Site to preserve, consolidate and transmit this resource. 

The Loire River, flanked by its adjoining canals, flows on the western edge of Charolais-Brionnais. The EuroVelo long-distance cycling route EV6, also named the Rivers Route, leaves the Loire at Digoin for the Canal du Centre, where it starts its way through the Charolais.

The Charolais-Brionnais was awarded with two food certifications of the European Union (protected designation of origin) for AOP Charolles Beef and AOP Charolais Goat Cheese.

Noteworthy landmarks and towns 
 Paray-le-Monial, nicknamed the city of the Sacred Heart
 Charolles, nicknamed the Venice of the Charolais
 Bourbon-Lancy, a spa town with a 2,000-year history
 La Clayette and its 14th- and 19th-century castle
 Semur-en-Brionnais and its 9th-century castle, one of the oldest in Burgundy

References

External links 
 

Geography of Saône-et-Loire